Asya Alashaikh (Arabic:آسيا ال الشيخ) is the first Saudi expert specializing in corporate social responsibility. She is the founder and CEO of Tamkeen Company for sustainable solutions in the Kingdom of Saudi Arabia.

She was assigned as a part-time consultant to the Shura Council (2008 - 2012), and today is the Vice President of the National Consultants at the Council of Saudi Chambers and a member of the CSR Committee at the Jeddah Chamber of Commerce.

Asya carries 24 years of experience in social work through various charitable and non-governmental organizations in Saudi Arabia, along with 12 years of experience in the field of development through her work with different developmental actors. She also has 8 years of experience in the field of sustainability and corporate social responsibility.

Today, Asya is working on a national project of corporate social responsibility under the title of "Integration" launched by the Council of Saudi Chambers in partnership with the Ministry of Trade and Industry. This project aims to develop a national framework for corporate social responsibility.

She was born on February 6 in Riyadh. Her father is the former Director of Security, Abdullah Bin Abdul Rahman Alashaikh, and her mother is Nora Hassan Alashaikh. She has five sisters and one brother. She also has one daughter (Alia).

Tamkeen Company

Asya AlaShaikh founded the Tamkeen Company as the first Saudi company to specialize in providing CSR consultancy and services to both private and public sectors in KSA. The company aims to put the Kingdom of Saudi Arabia on the global map of Sustainability.

Established in 2006, Tamkeen joins together a team of catalysts of different international and national expertise, dedicated to assisting companies in seizing opportunities and enhancing their competitive edge while setting solutions for national development challenges.

Tamkeen empowers its clients by offering corporate sustainability and responsibility consultancy, organizing trainings, presenting solutions, and providing responsible communication services.

Education

Asya Alashaikh earned a certificate in Corporate Social Responsibility and Competitiveness approved by the World Bank. She is a holder of a master's degree in Public Policy and Administration with a special focus on development and globalization theories from the University of Massachusetts, Amherst (2002-2004). She holds a BA in English Literature from King Saud University (1984-1988) and received her Baccalaureates degree from Al-Abna’a Secondary School in Riyadh - Saudi Arabia in 1976.

Asya and CSR

Asya Alashaikh believes that in the midst of the current economic and financial crisis, companies and institutions are facing challenges in fulfilling the aspirations and expectations of the shareholders. At a time when advertising through traditional means is no longer the only option for the delivery of information to the public, companies have resorted to more effective ways to reflect their approach in social responsibility and sustainable development.

She says that the world today carefully examines appropriate strategies designed to encourage and promote the concept of social responsibility within the company as one entity. The reason, according to her, is the emergence of an urgent need for responsible banking, markets and companies, in addition to executives who realize the size of the responsibility entrusted to them, along with an urgent need for social responsibility strategy programs in any company, regardless of its activities and orientations. This responsibility is supposed to reside in the nuclei of cells composing the structure of all companies and institutions, among those newly established. It must also enter in the composition of its structure, after the restructuring, in order to be socially responsible.

References

External links
 Tamkeen
 https://web.archive.org/web/20131221020601/http://www.okaz.com.sa/new/index.cfm?method=home.authors&authorsID=1061
 https://www.youtube.com/watch?v=mBfCUaTgKI4

Living people
Year of birth missing (living people)
Saudi Arabian chief executives
Saudi Arabian women in business